K Series  was a television programming block on the Tamil TV channel on Puthuyugam TV in Tamil Nadu featuring Tamil-dubbed Korean dramas. It launched on 12 May 2014 and aired Monday through Friday 9:00PM IST until 30 October 2015.

The second season of the Tamil-dubbed Korean dramas, which airs on Blacksheep TV from 23 January 2023.

Dramas on Puthuyugam TV

2015

Dramas on Blacksheep TV

References

Puthuyugam TV television series
2014 Tamil-language television series debuts
Tamil-language television shows
2023 Tamil-language television series debuts
Blacksheep original programming